Costa Beck is a small river in the Ryedale district of North Yorkshire, England. It also lends its name to an archaeological site.

Watercourse
It is a tributary of the River Rye which joins the River Derwent, eventually flowing into the River Ouse at Barmby on the Marsh.
Costa Beck was used for ship transport by mills as early as 1200. It is a Scandinavian name meaning a river full of fish or full of life.

The waters of Costa Beck are noted for their crystal-clarity, and fly fishing is popular and available via Pickering Fishery Association www.pickeringfishery.co.uk. Trout, dace, grayling, salmon,  and pike can all be found in Costa Beck and  kingfishers can be seen flying above. 
The river farther downstream lies adjacent to Flamingo Land Theme Park and Zoo, where visitors occasionally come from to fish.

Archaeological site
John Kirk undertook excavations at the Costa Beck between 1925 and 1929 – these excavations were published by Mary Kitson Clark in 1931. The excavations showed the presence of an Iron Age and Romano-British lakeside settlement.

References

Costa Beck
Iron Age sites in England
Archaeological sites in North Yorkshire
Roman sites in North Yorkshire
1920s archaeological discoveries
History of North Yorkshire